Antoine Arthur Leautey (born 14 April 1996) is a French professional footballer who plays for  club Amiens as a winger. He has also played senior football with Chamois Niortais and Boulogne, and passed through the youth systems at Caen and Paris Saint-Germain.

Playing career
Born in Versailles, near Paris, Leautey spent time in the youth set-up at Paris Saint-Germain as a junior. He later joined Caen, where he played 33 games for the reserve team between 2014 and 2016, scoring 10 goals. In the summer of 2016, Leautey agreed terms with Championnat National side Boulogne. After scoring twice in 14 appearances during the first-half of the season, he was signed by Ligue 2 club Chamois Niortais on a three-and-a-half-year contract. However, he was loaned back to Boulogne for the remainder of the 2016–17 season.

Leautey made his professional debut with Niort on the opening weekend of the 2017–18 campaign in the 0–0 draw with AC Ajaccio at the Stade René Gaillard on 28 July 2017. Two weeks later, he scored his first goal for the club in a 2–0 win over Auxerre after coming on as a substitute for Didier Lamkel Zé.

On 27 May 2022, Leautey signed a three-year contract with Amiens beginning in the 2022–23 season.

Career statistics

References

External links
 
 

1996 births
Living people
Sportspeople from Versailles, Yvelines
French footballers
Association football wingers
US Boulogne players
Chamois Niortais F.C. players
Gil Vicente F.C. players
Amiens SC players
Championnat National players
Ligue 2 players
Primeira Liga players
French expatriate footballers
Expatriate footballers in Portugal
French expatriate sportspeople in Portugal
Footballers from Yvelines